Altınçanak (sometimes called Altunçanak) is a village in the District of Gölbaşı, Ankara Province, Turkey. The village used to be part of Balâ district of Ankara, but was moved recently to Gölbaşı, as most of the village inhabitants were from that district. Much of the population is Kurdish.

References

Villages in Gölbaşı District, Ankara Province